IHP may refer to:

 Indicated horsepower
 Innovations for High Performance Microelectronics, a German institute and part of the Gottfried Wilhelm Leibniz Scientific Community
 Institut Henri Poincaré, a mathematics research institute in Paris, France
 International Hydrological Programme